Kenneth Baxter (October 1927 – May 1987) was an English professional rugby league footballer who played in the 1940s and 1950s.

Playing career
Ken Baxter made his first-team début for Leigh in the last game of the 1946–47 season, and he played his last match for Leigh against Keighley on Monday 20 August 1956.

References

External links
Search for "Baxter" at rugbyleagueproject.org

1927 births
1987 deaths
English rugby league players
Leigh Leopards players
Place of death missing
Rugby league centres
Rugby league five-eighths
Rugby league players from Wigan